This is a list of films and miniseries that are based on actual events. All films on this list are from American production unless indicated otherwise.

2000s

2010s

2020s

References

External links 
 History at the Movies: Historical and Period Films
 Internet Movie Database list
 Films based on historical events and people

 
Actual events
Lists of historical films